The Burmese–Siamese War (1584–1593), also known as the Nandric War(), was a war fought between the Toungoo dynasty of Burma and the Ayutthaya Kingdom of Siam. This war led Ayutthaya out of Burmese vassalship. This war was notable for the duel between King Naresuan and the Burmese Crown-Prince, Mingyi Swa. This war freed Siam from further Burmese domination for 174 years until 1767 when King Hsinbyushin invaded Siam, which resulted in the end of Ayutthaya rule.

Start of war (1584)

Ava Rebellion 
The Ava rebellion turned out to be just the opportunity Siam was looking for. Maha Thammarachathirat sent a 6,000-man army led by his son Naresuan ostensibly for Nanda's Ava campaign. But the Siamese army did not march to Ava as ordered but hovered around Pegu.

Battle of the Sittaung River 
Nanda dispatched an expedition force (4,000 men, 400 horses, 40 elephants) to chase the Siamese troops. The Burmese army finally caught up with the Siamese army near the Sittaung River, but was driven away when Naresuan shot a musket across the river and killed their commander.

Burmese Followup 
Nanda, enraged gathered another army (7,000 men, 500 horses, 50 elephants), and followed up. His son Mingyi Swa was his deputy. Unlike his father's meticulously planned Siamese campaigns, the expedition was hastily planned. An 11,000-man invasion force could never have conquered Siam, let alone in the rainy season. Indeed, the troops were caught unprepared by the flooded countryside by the Chao Phraya, and were nearly wiped out by Siamese on their war canoes.

Second campaign (1586–87)

Siege of Lampang 
In 1586, the king of Burma planned an invasion of Siam again. The invasion was set for northern Siam first. In March 1586, an army (12,000 troops, 1,200 horses, 100 elephants) led by Mingyi Swa invaded northern Siam from Lan Na. But the army could not get past a heavily fortified Lampang led by Naresuan, and had to withdraw in June.

Siege of Ayutthaya 
This was the largest force the Burmese King was able to field, but it was incapable of conquering Siam and was only a third of the last invasion by Bayinnaung in 1568.

The invasion fared well initially. Both armies overcame Siamese defenses and arrived before Ayutthaya by December. But the armies were not ready for a long-term siege of the heavily fortified capital. Because of poor planning, the troops began dying in thousands "from want and exposure" by February 1587. By March, the siege began to falter, and supplies streamed into Ayutthaya through gaps in the Burmese lines. Only a small portion of the original army made it back across the border.

Third Campaign (1590-1592)

Initial plans 
When Nanda Bayin had placed his sons as governors of Ava and Prome, he planned to resume the war against Siam. The Burmese were able to raise their largest force, 30,000 men. But the powerful Shan state of Mogaung had revolted, refusing to contribute its quota. Instead of focusing on Mogaung, the king decided to wage war on two fronts.

The Mogaung Revolt 
Nanda Bayin decided to redirect the troops for the invasion of northern Siam to deal with the Mogaung Revolt. Thado Dhamma Yaza III and Natshinnaung were able to take Mogaung by March 1591, and brought back the rebellious saopha to Pegu. But after the army left, the rebel chief's son, who was hiding outside the city, seized the city in November 1591. An 8,000-strong army led by Minye Kyawswa II had to return and put down the rebellion by mid-1592.

The Invasion of Siam 
This army had no such success. Like in 1586, Mingyi Swa invaded northern Siam from Lan Na, and could not again get past the Lampang fort led by Naresuan. But unlike in 1586, it was no mere retreat. The army was thoroughly defeated outside Lampang in March 1591. The remaining army arrived back in such disarray that Nanda verbally disparaged Mingyi Swa and executed some of the top generals.

Final invasion (1592–93)

Naresuan's offensive into Burma 
Knowing that the Burmese were somewhat unstable, Naresuan switched to offense in the following dry season of 1591–92 by raiding upper Tenasserim coast with a 5,000-strong army. Though army units from Martaban (Mottama) drove back Naresuan's army, the raid was a clear sign that the balance of power was shifting in favor of Siam. The Burmese court finally decided to launch another invasion into Siam.

Battle of Suphan Buri 
On , an invasion army of 24,000 tried again. After seven weeks, the army fought its way to Suphan Buri, a town just to the west of Ayutthaya. Here Burmese chronicle and Siamese chronicle narratives give different accounts. In the battle, Mingyi Swa was felled by a gunshot, after which the Burmese army retreated. According to Siamese chronicles, the battle took place on 18 January 1593. Like in the Burmese chronicles, the battle started out between the two forces but the Siamese chronicles say that midway through the battle, the two sides agreed to decide the outcome by having a duel between Mingyi Swa and Naresuan on their elephants, and that Mingyi Swa was cut down by Naresuan.

After this, the Burmese forces retreated, suffering heavy casualties along the way as the Siamese chased and destroyed their army. This was the last of the campaigns by Nanda Bayin to invade Siam.

For the next dozen years, it was Burma that would be on the defensive, "the tables of war turning for the first time in 30 years."

Notes

References

Bibliography

Damrong Rajanubhab (1928). Chris Baker (ed.). Our Wars with the Burmese: Thai–Burmese Conflict 1539–1767. Translated by Aung Thein (2001 ed.). Bangkok: White Lotus. .
Glenn S., ed. (24 August 2013). "ยุทธหัตถี" (Dictionary). Royal Institute Dictionary-1982. Thai-language.com. Retrieved 24 August 2013. a war elephant; combat while mounted on war elephants

Content has been copied from Nanda Bayin; see that page's history for attribution.

First Toungoo Empire
Wars involving the Ayutthaya Kingdom
Burmese–Siamese wars
1580s in Asia
1590s in Asia